Cockchafer soup is a European dish made from the cockchafer insect. It was a delicacy in Germany and France until the mid-1900s. Its taste resembles crab soup. As cockchafers were once an incredibly common pest insect in Europe, with population explosions every 4 years, collecting enough cockchafers to make soup was very easy in former times, but excessive pesticide usage caused their populations to collapse by the 1970s, with complete extirpation in many areas. Because the beetles are now relatively rare, the making of cockchafer soup has almost vanished entirely in communities where it was once commonplace.

Preparation
According to a French recipe from the 1800s, a batch of cockchafer soup requires 500 grams of the insect with their legs and wings removed. They are fried in butter, then cooked in a chicken or veal broth. The soup can be strained and eaten as a boullion, or crushed cockchafers can be mixed with egg yolk and roux. The soup was served with slices of veal liver or dove breast and with croutons. A single serving contains approximately 30 beetles.

See also
 List of soups

References 

German soups
Insects as food
French soups